Saburo Tanamachi (born 12 July 1931) is a Japanese sailor. He competed in the Dragon event at the 1964 Summer Olympics.

References

External links
 

1931 births
Living people
Japanese male sailors (sport)
Olympic sailors of Japan
Sailors at the 1964 Summer Olympics – Dragon
Place of birth missing (living people)